In astrophysics, Chandrasekhar's variational principle provides the stability criterion for a static barotropic star, subjected to radial perturbation, named after the Indian American astrophysicist Subrahmanyan Chandrasekhar.

Statement

is non-negative for all real functions  that conserve the total mass of the star .

where
 is the coordinate system fixed to the center of the star
 is the radius of the star
 is the volume of the star
 is the unperturbed density
 is the small perturbed density such that in the perturbed state, the total density is 
 is the self-gravitating potential from Newton's law of gravity
 is the Gravitational constant

References

Variational principles
Stellar dynamics
Astrophysics
Fluid dynamics
Equations of astronomy